Cool was a South Korean co-ed group that debuted in 1994.

History

They debuted in 1994 as "Why You Wanted to Be". In the 1st album, Kim Sung-soo, Lee Jae-hoon, Yu Chae-young and Choi Jun-myung were four, but from the second album, Yoo Chae-young and Choi Jun-myeong withdrew and while female member Yuri joined them, Kim Sung-soo and Lee Jae-hoon together acted as a three-member group.

Vocal Lee Jae-hoon's steady singing skills, fun songs and images continued to be popular. Cool's songs were simple and easy to sing, so it was easy for the general public to love it.  Their songs were often in the top sung songs in Korean karaoke.

They mainly performed in dance and ballad music. In 2002, they received the Golden Disk Award, recording their seventh album as the year's best-selling album. 

On August 2, 2005, they announced their disbandment, but on July 25, 2008, they started activities again after releasing the 10.5 "I Want to Love" album. In summer 2009, they released the 11th regular album. In 2014, they celebrated 20th anniversary with the release of "Goodbye" and began touring with broadcasting activities such as "Hidden Singer" and "Infinite Challenge."

Discography

Studio albums

Awards and nominations

Notes
  Many of the albums are referred to by number and not by name on the Music Industry Association of Korea album chart.

References

South Korean co-ed groups
K-pop music groups
South Korean pop music groups
South Korean dance music groups
Musical groups established in 1994
1994 establishments in South Korea